Trachyrhinus is a genus of harvestmen in the family Sclerosomatidae found in North America.

Species
 Trachyrhinus dicropalpus J. C. Cokendolpher, 1981
 Trachyrhinus favosus (Wood, 1871)
 Trachyrhinus horneri J. C. Cokendolpher, 1981
 Trachyrhinus marmoratus Banks, 1894
 Trachyrhinus mesillensis J. C. Cokendolpher, 1981
 Trachyrhinus rectipalpus J. C. Cokendolpher, 1981
 Trachyrhinus sonoranus Chamberlin, 1925

References

Harvestmen
Harvestman genera